"He Can't Love U" is a song  performed by American contemporary R&B group Jagged Edge, issued as the second single from their second studio album J.E. Heartbreak. Co-written by group members Brian and Brandon Casey, the song peaked at #15 on the Billboard Hot 100 in 1999.

The song was certified gold by the RIAA on January 19, 2000.

Music video

The official music video for "He Can't Love U" was directed by Tim Story.

Charts

Weekly charts

Year-end charts

References

External links
 
 

1999 songs
1999 singles
Jagged Edge (American group) songs
Music videos directed by Tim Story
Song recordings produced by Bryan-Michael Cox
Songs written by Bryan-Michael Cox
So So Def Recordings singles